Lagenophora stipitata, commonly known as blue bottle-daisy or common lagenophora, is a small plant in the family Asteraceae, found in eastern mainland Australia and Tasmania, and also from South East China to  East Asia, Java, and New Guinea.

References

External links
Lagenophora stipitata (Flora of China illustration)
Lagenophora stipitata GBIF occurrence data (showing some specimens collected in China)

stipitata
Flora of New South Wales
Flora of Victoria (Australia)
Flora of Tasmania
Flora of Queensland
Flora of South Australia
Flora of China
Flora of Papua New Guinea